Mükremin Deniz Kılıçlı (born October 23, 1990) is a Turkish professional basketball player for Pınar Karşıyaka of the Basketbol Süper Ligi (BSL).

Collegiate career

Freshman season
After missing the first 20 games of the season because of a suspension delivered by NCAA for playing on a team in his native country that included a professional player, Kılıçlı made his Mountaineers debut in February 2010, and helped make an immediate impact.

Professional career
After going undrafted in the 2013 NBA draft, Kılıçlı signed a contract with his homeland team Anadolu Efes Istanbul. In his first Euroleague season with the team, he averaged 1.9 points and 1.7 rebounds over 9 games. From 2015 to 2017 he played with İstanbul Büyükşehir Belediyespor

On December 11, 2017, he signed with Büyükçekmece Basketbol.

On July 4, 2020, he has signed with Bahçeşehir Koleji of the Turkish Basketball Super League (BSL).

On July 2, 2021, he has signed with Büyükçekmece Basketbol of the Turkish Basketball Super League (BSL).

On July 6, 2022, he has signed with Pınar Karşıyaka of the Basketbol Süper Ligi.

Personal life
Since 2015, he has been married to national volleyball player Büşra Cansu.

Awards

National
 2013 Mediterranean Games -

References

External links
 Deniz Kılıçlı at draftexpress.com
 Deniz Kılıçlı at espn.com
 Deniz Kılıçlı at euroleague.net
 Deniz Kılıçlı at tblstat.net
 

1990 births
Living people
Anadolu Efes S.K. players
Bahçeşehir Koleji S.K. players
Büyükçekmece Basketbol players
Competitors at the 2013 Mediterranean Games
İstanbul Büyükşehir Belediyespor basketball players
Karşıyaka basketball players
Mediterranean Games gold medalists for Turkey
Mediterranean Games medalists in basketball
Power forwards (basketball)
Sportspeople from Samsun
Trabzonspor B.K. players
Turkish expatriate basketball people in the United States
Turkish men's basketball players
West Virginia Mountaineers men's basketball players